College of Criminal Justice may refer to:

 College of Justice, the supreme courts of Scotland
 John Jay College of Criminal Justice, New York

See also
 Florida State University College of Criminology and Criminal Justice
 University of Cincinnati College of Education Criminal Justice and Human Services